Jerzy Twardokens (11 December 1931 – 26 July 2015) was a Polish fencer. He competed in the individual foil and team sabre events at the 1952 Summer Olympics.

After the World Fencing Championship in Philadelphia in 1958, Twardokens decided to stay in the United States. He later worked at the University of Nevada at Reno, where he was a professor who taught kinesiology. His daughter Eva Twardokens represented the United States in alpine skiing at two Olympic Games.

References

1931 births
2015 deaths
Polish male fencers
Polish emigrants to the United States
Polish defectors
Olympic fencers of Poland
Fencers at the 1952 Summer Olympics
Sportspeople from Poznań
University of Nevada, Reno faculty